Barton Creek may refer to:

 Barton Creek, a river in Texas
 Barton Creek, Texas, a  census-designated place in Texas
 Barton Creek (Belize), a river and an area in Belize